The canton of Saint-Calais is an administrative division of the Sarthe department, northwestern France. Its borders were modified at the French canton reorganisation which came into effect in March 2015. Its seat is in Saint-Calais.

It consists of the following communes:
 
Berfay
Bessé-sur-Braye
Bouloire
Champrond
La Chapelle-Huon
Cogners
Conflans-sur-Anille
Coudrecieux
Courgenard
Dollon
Écorpain
Gréez-sur-Roc
Lamnay
Lavaré
Maisoncelles
Marolles-lès-Saint-Calais
Melleray
Montaillé
Montmirail
Rahay
Saint-Calais
Sainte-Cérotte
Saint-Gervais-de-Vic
Saint-Jean-des-Échelles
Saint-Maixent
Saint-Mars-de-Locquenay
Saint-Michel-de-Chavaignes
Saint-Ulphace
Semur-en-Vallon
Thorigné-sur-Dué
Tresson
Val-d'Étangson
Valennes
Vancé
Vibraye
Volnay

References

Cantons of Sarthe